Don't Forget to Look Up is the fourth studio album by English/Irish singer Maverick Sabre, released on 28 January 2022 on Sabre's own imprint FAMM.

Critical reception

Eamon Sweeney of The Irish Times said that "Don't Forget to Look Up is for the most part very good, though sometimes it strays down some rather dull dead-ends." Joe Muggs of The Arts Desk stated that on Don't Forget to Look Up Sabre is "in great and distinctive form" but that "the one thing that's missing is killer hooks ... Ultimately this album feels steady-as-she-goes, an artist who's always gone his own way cementing his position, but it also feels full of promise of a really major statement yet to come."

Track listing

References

2022 albums
Maverick Sabre albums